Rock View or Rockview may refer to:

Rockview, Missouri, an unincorporated community in Scott County
Rock View, West Virginia, an unincorporated community in Wyoming County